This is a list of awards and nominations received by American actor, comedian, director, producer and screenwriter Ben Stiller.

Major associations

BAFTA Awards

Directors Guild of America

Emmy Award

Independent Spirit Awards

Miscellaneous awards

American Comedy Awards

Blockbuster Entertainment Awards

Comedy Film Awards

Dublin Film Critics' Circle

Golden Raspberry Awards

Hollywood Film Festival

MTV Movie & TV Awards

New York Film Festival

Nickelodeon Kids' Choice Awards

People's Choice Awards

Phoenix Film Critics Society

Satellite Awards

Saturn Award

Stinkers Bad Movie Awards

Teen Choice Awards

References

External links
 

Lists of awards received by American actor